Lucid may refer to:

Arts and entertainment
 Lucid (film), a 2005 Canadian film
 Lucid (Lyfe Jennings album), 2013 
 Lucid (Aṣa album), 2019
 Lucid EP, a 2006 EP by Art of Chaos
 "Lucid" (song), a 2020 song by Rina Sawayama
 Lucid, a 2015 novel by Jay Bonansinga

Businesses
 Lucid Inc., a software development company 
 Lucid Games, a British videogame company
 Lucid Records, an American independent record label
 Lucid Motors, an electric car company formerly called Atieva
 Lucid Software Inc., a diagramming software company

People
 Con Lucid (1874–1931), an American baseball player
 Lucid Fall (born 1975), South Korean singer-songwriter
 Shannon Lucid (born 1943), an American astronaut

Science and technology
 Lucid (programming language), a dataflow programming language
 LucidDB, an open-source database package
 Lucid Lynx, a version of Ubuntu Linux released in April 2010
 LUCID (Langton Ultimate Cosmic ray Intensity Detector), a cosmic ray detector

Other uses
 Lucid Absinthe, a distilled beverage made from grande wormwood
 Operation Lucid, British military plan to use fireships to attack France in World War II
 , the name of two U.S. Navy ships

See also 

 Lucidity (disambiguation)